Cordulephya pygmaea is a species of dragonfly of the family Cordulephyidae, 
also known as the common shutwing. 
It inhabits streams in eastern Australia.
It is small to tiny in size, coloured black, or purplish-black, with yellowish markings. It rests with its wings folded above its body in a similar manner to a damselfly.

Gallery

See also
 List of Odonata species of Australia

References

Cordulephyidae
Odonata of Australia
Endemic fauna of Australia
Taxa named by Edmond de Sélys Longchamps
Insects described in 1870